Said Hassan Shire is a Somalian politician. He is the former Speaker of the autonomous Puntland region's parliament from January 2014 to October 2015.

Biography
Shire is in his 40s, and hails from the eastern Sanaag region of Somaliland.

He has held various positions in both the Puntland regional administration and the central government. In 2000, Shire served as an MP in the Transitional National Government's interim parliament. He later acted as a Deputy Minister in the Transitional Federal Government in 2007. Since 2010, Shire also served as the Puntland Minister of Livestock and Animal Husbandry.

In December 2013, Shire was among 66 new MPs appointed to the Puntland parliament. He subsequently ran for Parliament Speaker during the 2014 Puntland elections, winning the third round ballot 40 votes to 26 votes against the runner-up, former Speaker of Parliament MP Abdirashid Mohamed Hersi of Mudug.

References

Living people
Somalian politicians
Somalian Muslims
Year of birth missing (living people)